The 2022–23 Idaho State Bengals men's basketball team represented Idaho State University in the 2022–23 NCAA Division I men's basketball season. The Bengals, led by fourth-year head coach Ryan Looney, played their home games at Reed Gym in Pocatello, Idaho as members of the Big Sky Conference.

Previous season
The Bengals finished the 2021–22 season 7–23, 5–15 in Big Sky play to finish in a tie for tenth place. In the Big Sky tournament, they were defeated by Portland State in the first round.

Roster

Schedule and results

|-
!colspan=12 style=| Exhibition

|-
!colspan=12 style=| Non-conference regular season

|-
!colspan=12 style=| Big Sky regular season

|-
!colspan=12 style=| 

Sources

References

Idaho State Bengals men's basketball seasons
Idaho State
Idaho State Bengals men's basketball
Idaho State Bengals men's basketball